Amanda Eyre Ward is an American writer.

Her book reviews appear in the New York Times.

Works 

The Sober Lush, TarcherPerigee, 2020.  
 The Same Sky : a novel, Ballantine Books, New York, 2015. 
 The Nearness of You, Ballantine Books, New York, 2017.  
 The Jetsetters, Ballantine Books, New York, 2020.  
 The Lifeguards, Ballantine Books, New York, 2022.

References

External links 
Official website

Living people
Year of birth missing (living people)
American women writers